Huan Yi was a general of the state of Qin in the late Warring States period (5th century – 221 BCE).

Background
General Pang Nuan of Zhao occupied several towns of the state of Yan in 236 BCE, whereupon Yan asked the state of Qin for help. Huan Yi, Yang Duan, and Wang Jian commanded the relief campaign against Zhao and took its towns Ye (today's Linzhang, Hebei) and Anyang (Hebei), as well as Eyu (Heshun, Shanxi), and Liaoyang (Zuoquan, Shanxi).

In 236 BC, the Qin generals Huan Yi and Wang Jian seize nine cities in the Yecheng region.

In 234 BC, Huan Yi attacked Pingyang (Linfen, Shanxi) and Wucheng (Cixian, Hebei), killed general Hu Zhe and massacred 100,000 troops of Zhao. He then left Shangdang, passed the Taihang Ridge and invaded Zhao by taking Chili and Yi'an (Gaocheng, Hebei). Zhao thereupon laid the supreme command in the hands of Li Mu, who defeated Huan Yi in the battle of Fei (Jinxian, Hebei).

No record of Huan Yi is found in the Shiji after his defeat at Feixia, however in the Zhan Guo Ce (a different historical source) it's mention that Huan Yi later died by attacking Handan, the capital of Zhao defended by Li Mu in one of the last Qin-Zhao battles.

In popular culture
Huan Yi is portrayed by the actor Lü Xiaohe in the film The Emperor and the Assassin (1998) and by Wang Ya'nan in the television series Assassinator Jing Ke (2004).

In the Manga and Anime Kingdom, he is portrayed as Kanki an ex-bandit leader nicknamed "The Beheader" and one of the new appointed "Qin Six Great Generals" for his prodigious skill for warfare relying mostly on unconventional tactics and psychological warfare. He initially served as one of the Vice Generals in Meng Ao's army alongside General Wang Jian.

References

See also
List of people who were beheaded

Year of birth unknown
Qin dynasty generals
Qin state people